Houston is an unincorporated community in Winston County, Alabama, United States.  It was the county seat from 1858 until 1884, when the seat was moved to Double Springs.  Houston has one site on the National Register of Historic Places, the log Houston Jail.

Demographics

Houston appeared once on the U.S. Census in 1880, shortly before it lost its status as county seat. It has not appeared on census rolls since.

Geography

References

Unincorporated communities in Alabama
Unincorporated communities in Winston County, Alabama
Former county seats in Alabama
Towns in Alabama
Ghost towns in Alabama
Ghost towns in the United States
Ghost towns in North America